CIHA may refer to:
Champion, Quebec, a re-broadcaster of CIHA-FM
Chinese Ice Hockey Association
Christmas Is Here Again
Collegiate Ice Hockey Association
Collegiate Inline Hockey Association, a former name of the National Collegiate Roller Hockey Association
Comité International d'Histoire de l'Art
Cook Islands Handball Association
Critical Investigations into Humanitarianism in Africa, for which Benjamin Lawrance is an editor